The Frog Skin is a battledress camouflage pattern with mottle and disruptive coloration to blend into the environment similar to a frog's crypsis skin.

The M1942 Frog Skin pattern was the United States military's first attempt at disruptive coloration camouflage.

History 
In 1942, the Marine Raiders were the first issued the Frog Skin uniform, which was reversible with a five-color jungle pattern on a green background on one side and a three-color beach pattern with a tan background on the other side. The pattern was made for the M1942 Reversible Spot Pattern and P42 Camo utility uniform based on the herringbone twill (HBT) cotton fabric.

The Paramarines had their own pattern uniform in the same camouflage pattern in the Bougainville campaign.

The uniform was worn by the Marines in other campaigns, notably the Battle of Tarawa. In the ETO certain US Infantry divisions wore the uniform in France, but the uniform was withdrawn for resembling German camouflaged uniforms.

By January 1944, production of the pattern was stopped with the uniforms being sold as surplus. It found its way to civilians, including duck hunters. This led to the adoption of the name Duck Hunter camo.

Combat Use
The United States used the pattern in limited use in the Korean War for Marines for helmets as helmet covers.

The Frog Skin pattern to France who issued it to their 1st Foreign Parachute Regiment and 2nd Foreign Parachute Regiment during the First Indochina War.

In 1961, the Cuban exiles Brigade 2506 were issued the Frog Skin pattern by the Central Intelligence Agency (CIA) for the Bay of Pigs Invasion.

During the Vietnam War, the United States Special Forces issued Frog Skin to the Montagnard for their guerrilla warfare activities. Navy SEALs and Rangers resorted to using the camo due to a lack of a standard camouflage. Army Special Forces advisers, sailors and Marines attached to the Military Assistance Command Vietnam — Naval Advisory Group and the CIDG also used it before Tigerstripe uniforms were issued.

Design
The design was done by Norvell Gillespie, a civilian horticulturist and the gardening editor for Better Homes & Gardens magazine, at the request of the US military. 150,000 uniforms in the pattern were ordered. Feedback from American soldiers who used it said that the lighter color base stood out when moving in the dark jungle.

Similar patterns
The German created Flecktarn is a multi-colored mottled pattern, which creates a dithering effect by eliminating hard color boundaries and has been adopted by many countries. The Australian Defence Force Disruptive Pattern Camouflage Uniform is a five-color mottle pattern, which utilizes disruptive coloration to break up a soldiers outline with a strongly contrasting design.

The duck hunter camouflage pattern was first seen with some American units fighting in Vietnam, based on the frog skin pattern.

Users

 : Acquired M1942 camos in 1968 for Biafran soldiers. Pro-Biafran mercenaries recruited also use the same camos.
 : Wore camouflage patterns based on the M1942.
 : 1st Foreign Parachute Regiment and 2nd Foreign Parachute Regiment in First Indochina War.
 : 
 Brimob forces wore copies based on the US M1942 from 1965.
 Pasukan Gerak Tjepat and Resimen Para Komando Angkatan Dara commandos wore copies based on the M1942 pattern. Original M1942 camo uniforms were used back in the 1950s by PGT/RPKAD and airborne troops from 1954 to 1960, worn with the green pattern visible.
 : Copies worn by the Mexican military.
 
 :
 United States Marine Corps
 Marine Raiders
 Brigade 2506
 Paramarines
 : Three-color pattern used in 1970 and was mostly used for ponchos, helmet covers, field equipment and some on clothes.
 : Formerly used M1942 camo clones; first examples seen in the 1970s.

References

Bibliography
 
 
 

Camouflage patterns
Military camouflage
Military equipment introduced from 1940 to 1944